In Malay, Yang di-Pertuan Besar, literally "He Who Is Made Chief Ruler", is a title given to the head of state in segments of the Malay Archipelago.

In Malaysia
 Also known as Yamtuan Besar, it is the title of the elected monarch of the state of Negeri Sembilan in Malaysia. The monarch is himself one of the nine Malay rulers and electors of the federal Yang di-Pertuan Agong (High King).
 It is a subsidiary title of the Sultan of Kedah, the Sultan of Kelantan, the Sultan of Perak and the Sultan of Terengganu
 Other historical figures, especially the monarchs of the ancient Johor Empire (circa. 17th-19th century), had the title used to differentiate from the "Yang di-Pertuan Muda" ("Under King") - who is usually not Malay but Bugis. However, this was a secondary title, the primary title being sultan.
 A peculiar occurrence in Terengganu history was that, after Sultan Zainal Abidin I died, his youngest son, Sultan Mansur Riayat Shah I was enthroned as Sultan with the title Yang di-Pertuan Kecil (during his minority), while his oldest son, Ku Tanang Wangsa held the Yang di-Pertuan Besar title equivalent to Regent.

In Indonesia
In colonial Indonesia, the Governor-General of the Dutch East Indies was styled: Yang Mulia Sri Paduka Yang Dipertuan Besar.
 Secondary title of the Sultans of Asahan (in Sumatra), Sultan of Riau-Lingga and Sultan of Siak Sri Indrapura (the latter two are located Sumatra, which broke away from the Johor Empire)

References

Noble titles of Indonesia
Noble titles of Malaysia
Malaysian monarchy
Malaysian nobility
Royal titles